Güven Varol (born 2 June 1981) is a Turkish former professional footballer who played as an attacking midfielder.

Club career 
Varol began his career with Pendikspor in 2000. He joined Beykozspor in 2002 and Denizlispor in 2004. After playing for Manisaspor from 2006–2010, he signed a three-year contract with Ankaragücü.

References

External links
 

1981 births
Living people
Turkish footballers
Turkey B international footballers
MKE Ankaragücü footballers
Beykozspor footballers
Denizlispor footballers
Manisaspor footballers
Pendikspor footballers
Kardemir Karabükspor footballers
Süper Lig players
Sportspeople from Adapazarı
TFF First League players
Association football midfielders